Usman Khattar railway station is  located in Tehsil Taxila of District Rawalpindi Pakistan. 
Usman Khattar (Taxila) is surrounded by Wah Cantt on one side and Hassan Abdal on the other side.

See also
 List of railway stations in Pakistan
 Pakistan Railways

References

External links

Railway stations in Rawalpindi District
Railway stations on Taxila–Khunjerab Railway Line